Sanger may refer to:

Places

Romania
 Sânger, a commune in Mureș County

United States
 Sanger, California, a city
 Sanger, North Dakota, a ghost town
 Sanger, Texas, a city
 Sanger, West Virginia, an unincorporated community

People
 Sanger (surname), including a list of people with the name

Other uses
 Wellcome Trust Sanger Institute, a genome research centre in Cambridgeshire, England
 Sanger (fortification) or sangar, a small temporary fortified position
 Sandwich, colloquially called a "sanger" in Australian and Scottish English

See also
 Sanger-Harris, a former department store
 
 
 Sänger (disambiguation)